Gaina may refer to:

 Gaina (company), a Japanese animation studio
 Gaina (name), a Romanian surname
 Kazuya Yuasa (born 1979), professional wrestler also known as Gaina

See also
 Găina River (disambiguation)
 Gainas, a Gothic leader